Alice Torriani (born 25 March 1984) is an Italian film actor, author and screenwriter. She is notable for her portrayal of Andreina in Il Paradiso delle Signore (Ladies' Paradise) directed by Monica Vullo and as the author of the novel L'altra Sete (A Different Thirst).

Early life 
Alice graduated from The Paolo Grassi Drama School in Milan in 2007 and started theatrical tours in Italy and Europe with Romeo Castellucci, Alvis Hermanis, Massimo Castri, Gabriele Lavia and Franca Valeri among others.

Alice graduated from Paolo Grassi Drama School in Milan in 2007, after three years of intense studies. Upon receiving the sought after diploma, Massimo Castri, the critically acclaimed Italian director, cast her as the female lead in Chekhov's Three Sisters. This life-changing part took Alice on a one-year tour, as she performed in some of the most celebrated theatres across Italy.

When the Italian tour came to an end, it was now renowned director Gabriele Lavia who took a bow, as he too cast Alice for the female lead part in Dostoyevsky's Memoirs from the House of The Dead.

The Russian writer's imagination, coupled with Lavia's vision, fueled Alice's quixotic spirit, and just a few months later she landed in Moscow, for the shooting of the film Ten Winters, which went on to win the 2010 David di Donatello prize for Best Debut, as well as the Silver Ribbon for Best First Work at the Venice Film Festival.

During that same year Alice started working on the European Project "Prospero", under the guiding hand of Latvian director Alvis Hermanis. Together, they brought The Young Ladies of Wilko, Hermanis's first work with Italian actors, to the stages of Milan, Paris, Venice, Berlin, Lisbon, Moscow, Rennes, Liege, Lotz, and Tampere, in a production spanning two fulfilling years.

Actor 

In cinema she made her appearance in Ten Winters by Valerio Mieli (2010 David di Donatello prize for Best Debut), the commercially successful E'nata una star directed by Lucio Pellegrini and based on the novel Not a Star by Nick Hornby, D.A.D. by Marco Maccaferri and Them Who? by Francesco Miccichè and Fabio Bonifaci. In an effort to ever improve her acting skills she has visited the Margie Haber Studio in Los Angeles and Jordan Bayne's in New York numerous time and she is always working on her skills. She has participated in many 'acting for the stage' workshops with Luca Ronconi, Antonio Latella, and other international directors at the Venice Biennale of Theatre.

In the five-year period encompassing 2009 through 2013 Alice work as part of the lead cast for various television shows, and in 2013/2014, in the remarkable company of some of Italy's most illustrious actors, she performed the play Visita al padre, which Carmelo Rifici directed, at the celebrated Piccolo Teatro di Milano. She has guest-starred in one episode of Montalbano, "A voice of the night" which aired in Italy in 2013.

In 2014, Romeo Castellucci (whose Dante's Divine Comedy the French newspaper Le Monde called "the best play, and one of the ten most influential cultural events in the world for the decade 2000–2010") cast Alice for the show The Four Season Restaurant, which was performed in Philadelphia in September 2014.

In 2015, Alice took the second female lead in the Italian TV serial adaptation of The Paradise based on the French novel Au Bonheur des Dames by Emile Zola. The Italian series, produced by RAI, are named Il Paradiso delle Signore and Torriani's role was of Andreina Mandelli, the daughter of an influential banker in Milan.

Just a few months later, Alice brought her skills to the aid of Franca Valeri, one of Italy's most sought after comedians, as they took the stage together in the play Il cambio dei cavalli, which Valeri penned herself.

Furthermore, in 2016, Torriani took on one of the main roles in the TV series Un Paso dal Ciello, season 4, as Cristina Fabricetti, in a total of 18 episodes.

Filmography

Author 

Torriani's first novel, L'Altra Sete, was published by Fandango Libri in 2015.
In 2016 L'Altra Sete was chosen to represent Italy at the Festival Européen du Premier Roman, in Germany. In November, 2018, the novel Una Vita a Posto, authored by Torriani, was published by Fandango Libri.

Screenwriter 
In 2015, with Giampiero Judica, she wrote her first screenplay for the TV series Cleaning your Shit, which was filmed in 2017. Alice played the main role.

References

External links 
 
 

1984 births
21st-century Italian actresses
21st-century Italian novelists
Living people